Eric Vishria (born 1979) is a general partner at Benchmark, a venture capital firm based in Silicon Valley. Previously, he was CEO and co-founder of Rockmelt and served as vice president at Yahoo  following Yahoo's acquisition of Rockmelt.

Career
Vishria graduated from Stanford University at age 19 with a B.S. in mathematical and computational science and a minor in human biology. He began his career in investment banking at Broadview International and got his first entrepreneurial experience as an early employee at Loudcloud and later Opsware. When Opsware was acquired by Hewlett-Packard in 2007 for $1.65 billion, Vishria was serving as VP of marketing.  After the acquisition, Eric became vice president of the products, software, technology solutions group in HP Software.

In October 2008, Vishria left HP to co-found RockMelt with Tim Howes, and launched the RockMelt social browser in November 2010. In 2013, RockMelt was acquired by Yahoo for a reported $60–70 million, where Vishria started working as a Yahoo VP. In 2014, Vishria joined Benchmark as a general partner, the first partner addition in over 6 years. In November 2014, Vishria led Benchmark's investment in Confluent, an open-source data platform built around Apache Kafka.  

In 2015, he led Benchmark’s investments in Bugsnag, an automated crash-detection platform, and Amplitude, a provider of mobile and Web-based analytics that tracks user behavior. In 2016, Vishria led the firm’s investment in Contentful, a content management platform.

References

1979 births
Living people
Stanford University alumni
21st-century American businesspeople